Pamięcin  is a village in the administrative district of Gmina Blizanów, in Kalisz County, Greater Poland Voivodeship in west-central Poland.

References

Villages in Kalisz County